Beiwangli is a town in Zhao County in southwestern Hebei, China, located  west of the county seat. , it had 27 villages under its administration:
Gou'an Village
Hezhuang Village
Jialü Village
Xiwangjiazhuang Village
Fujiazhuang Village
Wujia Village
Nanwangli Village
Beiwangli Village
Kangjia Village
Maping Village
Xizhangjiazhuang Village
Dongzhanglü Village
Xizhanglü Village
Yongxingzhuang Village
Houtian Village
Qiantian Village
Houying Village
Qianying Village
Huanmaying Village
Daliuli Village
Xiaoliuli Village
Ma Village
Xizheng Village
Yanjiazhai Village
Lunchengzhuang Village
Nanluncheng Village
Huangshi Village

See also
List of township-level divisions of Hebei

References

Township-level divisions of Hebei
Zhao County